DAQI may refer to

 Daily Air Quality Index
 Daqi-1, a Chinese satellite